Manyame Air Base is one of the two main air bases for the Air Force of Zimbabwe. Formerly known as New Sarum Air Force Station, Manyame Air Base is situated in Harare and is the principal air force establishment and provides facilities for aircraft squadrons of differing roles, training schools for technicians, staff and academic training and security dog handlers. A full range of amenities, which include workshops, transport fleets, equipment depots, accommodation, sports and entertainment facilities, support the base. Located on the same grounds as the Harare International Airport and sharing the same runway, it is home to these squadrons. It also houses the technical training school and the dog training unit. The base has a hospital and is surrounded by farmland as it is located on the outskirts of the capital city. It uses the same facilities as Harare International Airport:

3rd Squadron (Falcon) - transport. Operating the Casa 212-200 and Britten-Norman BN-2 Islander.
7th Squadron (Spider) - combat helicopter squadron with Alouette III, AS 532 and Mi-35Ps.
8th Squadron (Scorpion) - Agusta-Bell 412SP

External links
Air Force of Zimbabwe

Air Force of Zimbabwe
Harare
Airports in Zimbabwe
Zimbabwean airbases